Fort Worth, the 5th-most populous city in the U.S. state of Texas, is home to 50 high-rises, 21 of which stand taller than . The tallest building in the city is the 40-story Burnett Plaza, which rises  in Downtown Fort Worth and was completed in 1983. The second-tallest skyscraper in the city is the Bank of America Tower (known until 2017 as the D.R. Horton Tower), which rises 547 feet (167 m). None of the buildings in Fort Worth are among the 30 tallest buildings in Texas.

Fort Worth's history of skyscrapers began with the completion of the 7-story Flatiron Building in 1907. When built, it was the tallest building in North Texas. The Flatiron Building stood as Fort Worth's tallest structure until 1910, with the construction of the 10-story Baker Building (since renamed the Bob R. Simpson Building). Fort Worth went through a major growth in skyscrapers during the 1920s and 1930s, with the Farmers and Mechanics National Bank building (since renamed 714 Main) emerging as the tallest in the city. The Farmers and Mechanics building remained the tallest in the city until 1957, when the 30-story Landmark Tower was completed. From the early 1970s to the mid-1980s, Fort Worth went through the largest construction boom in the city's history. In 1983, the 40-floor Burnett Plaza was constructed, surpassing the Landmark Tower. The Burnett Plaza has remained the tallest structure in the city to date.



Tallest buildings
This list ranks completed and topped out skyscrapers in Fort Worth that stand at least , based on standard height measurement. This includes spires and architectural details but does not include antenna masts. The "Year" column indicates the year in which a building was completed. Freestanding observation towers, while not habitable buildings, are included for comparison purposes but not ranked.

Tallest demolished buildings
This list ranks completed skyscrapers in Fort Worth that stood at least , based on standard height measurement, but have since been demolished in any manner.

Tallest under construction, approved, and proposed
This list shows high-rises that are under construction, approved, or proposed in Fort Worth and planned to rise at least  in height, but are not yet completed structures. An equal sign (=) following a rank indicates the same height between two or more buildings.

Timeline of tallest buildings
This list shows chronologically the buildings that held the title of tallest building in Fort Worth.

See also

 List of tallest buildings in Texas
 List of tallest buildings in Dallas
 List of tallest buildings in Houston

Notes
A. According to the Council on Tall Buildings and Urban Habitat, freestanding observation towers are not considered buildings, as they are not fully habitable structures. This structure is included for comparative purposes.

References

Fort Worth

Fort Worth